Azra Aftab is a Pakistani actress. She is known for her roles in dramas Dhuwan, Manzil, Laag, Dasht and Madiha Maliha.

Early life
Azra was born in 1958 on November 23 in Karachi, Pakistan. She joined the industry in 1990.

Career
Azra appeared in dramas on PTV in 1990. She was noted for her roles in drama Laag, Manzil, Mohabbat Rooth Jaye Toh, Farz, Hazaron Khwahishen, and Aasmanon Pay Likha. She also appeared in dramas Kuda Zameen Se Gaya, Kaghaz Kay Phool, Ek Sitam Aur Sahi, Aankh Bhar Asman and Chalo Phir Se Jee Kar Dekhain. Since then she appeared in dramas Dil Awaiz, Pul Sirat, Painjra, Kaise Huaye Benaam, Lakhon Mein Aik, Bhai and Bari Bahu.

Filmography

Television

Telefilm

Film

Awards and nominations

References

External links
 

1958 births
Living people
20th-century Pakistani actresses
Pakistani television actresses
PTV Award winners
21st-century Pakistani actresses
Pakistani film actresses